George Hannah may refer to:

George Hannah (footballer, born 1914) (1914–1977), English footballer who played for Derby County and Port Vale
George Hannah (footballer, born 1928) (1928–1990), English footballer who played for six clubs in Ireland and England

See also
George Hanna (disambiguation)